The Petit ministère of 1851 governed France from 24 January 1851 to 10 April 1851 during the French Second Republic, replacing the Cabinet of Alphonse Henri d'Hautpoul.
It was a compromise cabinet formed by President Louis-Napoleon Bonaparte after the National Legislative Assembly had refused to accept a cabinet dominated by Bonapartists, and had no president.
It was replaced by the Cabinet of Léon Faucher on 10 April 1851.
The ministers were:

References

Sources

French governments
1851 establishments in France
1851 disestablishments in France
Cabinets established in 1851
Cabinets disestablished in 1851